Yoann Court (born 14 January 1990) is a French professional footballer who plays as a left winger for Ligue 2 club Stade Malherbe Caen. He has been capped at France U20 level.

Club career
Yoann Court joined Lyon in 2010 and spent five years there before he signed for Sedan on a free-transfer in 2010. During the 2010–11 season he played 21 games, scoring 6 goals. In his second season, Court played 22 games and scoring 3 goals in the league, last season Court could not stop Sedan getting relegated from Ligue 2 to the CFA.

In July 2013, Court left Sedan to join recently relegated side Troyes AC on a three-year deal and was given the number 28 shirt for the 2013–14 season. He continued his career in Gazélec Ajaccio, Bourg-en-Bresse, and Brest from 2016 to 2020.

On 18 September 2020, Court signed a two-year contract with Stade Malherbe Caen. He chose the number 13 at the club.

International career
Yoann Court has been capped at youth levels up to France U20 level.

Career statistics

Club

References

External links
 
 
 

1990 births
Living people
People from Carpentras
Sportspeople from Vaucluse
Association football wingers
French footballers
France youth international footballers
AC Avignonnais players
Olympique Lyonnais players
CS Sedan Ardennes players
ES Troyes AC players
Gazélec Ajaccio players
Football Bourg-en-Bresse Péronnas 01 players
Stade Brestois 29 players
Ligue 1 players
Ligue 2 players
Footballers from Provence-Alpes-Côte d'Azur